Rivers Cadet (1 March 1892 – 1 November 1968) was a French actor.

Cadet was born Jean Maurice Large in Paris. He was the brother of Fernand Rivers.

Selected filmography
 Maurin of the Moors (1932)
 The Ironmaster (1933)
 Three Sailors (1934)
 Good Luck (1935)
 The Two Boys (1936)
 Street Singer (1938)
 Tricoche and Cacolet (1938)
 Golden Venus (1938)
 Berlingot and Company (1939)
 Behind the Facade (1939)
 Louise (1939)
 Sing Anyway (1940)
 Paris-New York (1940)
 Monsieur Hector (1940)
 Notre-Dame de la Mouise (1941)
 The Last of the Six (1941)
 Les Enfants du Paradis (1945)
 The Woman I Murdered (1948)
 The Red Angel (1949)
 Adémaï au poteau-frontière (1950)
 Mademoiselle Josette, My Woman (1950)
 The Night Is My Kingdom (1951)
 The Sleepwalker (1951)
 Topaze (1951)
 The Road to Damascus (1952)
 The Lottery of Happiness (1953)
 Tower of Lust (1955)
 Blood to the Head (1956)
 Captain Fracasse (1961)

External links

1892 births
1968 deaths
French male film actors
Male actors from Paris
20th-century French male actors